Mount Vsevidof ( or) is a stratovolcano in the U.S. state of Alaska. Its summit is the highest point on Umnak Island, one of the eastern Aleutian Islands. Its symmetrical cone rises abruptly from its surroundings. Vsevidof's most recent eruption was caused by an earthquake on March 9, 1957. The mountain erupted on March 11, 1957, and the eruption ended the next day.

Its name comes from Russian words for “all” and “sight”, suggesting that it was implied to mean “seen from everywhere” or “where every place is seen from”.

Nearby towns to Vsevidof include Nikolski, Unalaska, Akutan, Atka and Anchorage.



See also

List of mountain peaks of North America
List of mountain peaks of the United States
List of mountain peaks of Alaska
List of Ultras of the United States
List of volcanoes in the United States

References

Notes

External links

 Volcanoes of the Alaska Peninsula and Aleutian Islands-Selected Photographs
 Mount Vsevidof on the Alaska Volcano Observatory Website

Landforms of Aleutians West Census Area, Alaska
Stratovolcanoes of the United States
Mountains of Alaska
Volcanoes of Alaska
Aleutian Range
Umnak
Mountains of Unorganized Borough, Alaska
Volcanoes of Unorganized Borough, Alaska
Holocene stratovolcanoes